Luís Fabiano Clemente (born 8 November 1980), commonly known as Luís Fabiano, is a retired Brazilian professional footballer who played as a striker most notably for Sevilla, São Paulo, and the  Brazil national team.

He is a prolific goalscorer and was ranked the second-highest-scoring Brazilian of the 21st century, according to the International Federation of Football History & Statistics.

Club career

Early career
Luís Fabiano enjoyed great success during two spells with Brazilian side São Paulo, with a disappointing period at French side Rennes sandwiched in between. His strength on the ball, accurate finishing and pace made him a vital part of the side that fell in the semi-finals of the 2004 Copa Libertadores de América.

Luís Fabiano was labeled the "bad boy" of Brazilian football when playing for São Paulo after a number of brawls. During a 2003 Copa Sudamericana match for São Paulo against River Plate of Argentina, a fight between the players broke out. Luís Fabiano ran behind a River player and kicked him just below the neck. While being escorted off the field, Luís Fabiano said that he "would rather fight than take a penalty". He was given a three-match ban from all competitions.

Porto
Luís Fabiano moved to Portugal to play for Porto in 2004 for a €1.875 million transfer fee; Porto, however, only bought 25% of his rights, the other 75% belonging to Global Soccer Investments (later renamed to Rio Football Services). At Porto, Luís Fabiano was reunited with his international teammate Diego, who he played with on the Brazil squad at the 2004 Copa América. Luís Fabiano had a troublesome season, however, scoring only three goals in 22 matches. This led to him being transferred to La Liga side Sevilla.

Sevilla signed 25% economic right from Porto and later signed a further 10% from Rio Football Services for €1.2 million, with a pre-set price of remains 65% rights for €7.15 million to be excised on or before 15 April 2007, although it was never excised. Moreover, Sevilla had to pay Rio Football Services €450,000 annually. Eventually, the third parties ownership had brought to the court.

Sevilla
On 10 May 2006, Luís Fabiano scored a header during Sevilla's 4–0 victory over Middlesbrough in the UEFA Cup Final. The success continued in the 2007–08 season, as Luís Fabiano finished runner-up in the Pichichi Trophy with 24 goals (including two from the penalty spot), second only to Daniel Güiza's 27 goals. This led to Luís Fabiano being recalled to the Brazilian Seleção. On 29 November, Luís Fabiano was sent off for elbowing Barcelona's Sergio Busquets. He had to be restrained by the Sevilla staff. In 2008, Luís Fabiano extended his contract with Sevilla to 2011.

On 4 July 2009, according to Luís Fabiano's agent, Milan made an official offer for him, with Luís Fabiano reportedly pleading with his club Sevilla to allow him to make the switch to the San Siro. The deal, however, did not go through.

On 30 August 2010, Luís Fabiano put an end to the speculation with a move away from Sevilla by signing a contract extension until 2013. On the renewal, he stated his intentions: "This is my home, I've been here six seasons and I will try to continue scoring goals and continue making history for Sevilla."

Return to São Paulo
On 13 March 2011, Luís Fabiano returned to Brazil to rejoin São Paulo. The Brazilian club paid €7.6 million for the striker, who signed a four-year deal. He was welcomed by 45,000 fans at his presentation at Estádio do Morumbi. On 29 July 2012, playing against Flamengo, Luís Fabiano scored two goals and thus became the seventh-most prolific goalscorer of São Paulo's history, outscoring Leônidas.

On 26 August 2012, Luís Fabiano scored twice in São Paulo's 2–1 win over Corinthians. In 2013, however, after a year in which he was injured or had been out of form, Luís Fabiano was charged by Muricy Ramalho, then the coach of club. According to Ramalho, using Ganso (who recovered his good shape) as an example, Ramalho stated Luís Fabiano needs "wanting more".

In December 2015, he was released from São Paulo and joined Chinese club Tianjin Quanjian as a free agent.

International career
Luís Fabiano made his debut for Brazil on 11 June 2003 in a friendly against Nigeria, marking his international debut with a goal before being substituted. He was also included in Brazil's squad for 2003 FIFA Confederations Cup, but did not make any appearances.

He won the 2004 Copa América with Brazil, where he started in all five matches alongside striker Adriano. With his poor form in Europe with Porto and Sevilla, however, he did not make any further international appearances for more than three years. He was finally recalled to the national team in November 2007 for 2010 FIFA World Cup qualification matches. On 19 November 2008, he scored his first international hat-trick in a friendly match against Portugal in Brasília. The match ended in a 6–2 victory for Brazil.

On 28 June 2009, Luís Fabiano scored two goals in the 2009 FIFA Confederations Cup final win against the United States. He won the golden boot as the tournament's top scorer with five goals.

Luís Fabiano scored his first international goal in nine months with a right-footed strike against Ivory Coast on 20 June 2010 in the 2010 World Cup. He followed it up with a second goal, which he scored after touching the ball with his hands on two occasions. His third goal of the competition came against Chile in the round of 16 on 29 June 2010, as Brazil won 3–0. On 11 September 2012, Luís Fabiano was called up for the first time since the 2010 World Cup by then coach Mano Menezes for the two Superclásico de las Américas matches against national rivals Argentina, held in both Brazil and Argentina respectively.

Style of play
Luís Fabiano was a prolific, skilful and powerful goalscorer, with excellent creativity, dribbling skills, and technical ability; he also had a strong physical presence against defenders and goalkeepers. Nonetheless, he had a poor disciplinary record, despite playing as a forward. Even as the top goalscorer in the 2013 season with 16 goals by June, he had received several red cards, hindering São Paulo in important games.

Personal life
Luís Fabiano is married to Juliana Paradela Clemente, and has three children, Giovanna, Gabriella and Giulie.
In 2005, his mother was kidnapped by gunmen in Campinas. She was rescued by police 62 days later.

Career statistics

Club
Sources:

 Other – Torneio Rio – São Paulo, Copa dos Campeões, Coupe de la Ligue, Intercontinental Cup & Supercopa de España

International
Source:

Scores and results list Brazil's goal tally first. Score column indicates score after each Luís Fabiano goal.

Honours
São Paulo
 Copa Sudamericana: 2012
 Torneio Rio-São Paulo: 2001

Porto
 Intercontinental Cup: 2004

Sevilla
 Copa del Rey: 2006–07, 2009–10
 Supercopa de España: 2007
 UEFA Cup: 2005–06, 2006–07
 UEFA Super Cup: 2006

Tianjin Quanjian
 China League One: 2016

Brazil
 Copa América: 2004
 FIFA Confederations Cup: 2009

Individual
 Campeonato Brasileiro Série A Top Scorer: 2002
 Bola de Prata: 2002, 2003
 Placar Golden Boot: 2003 (most goals in all competitions in Brazil)
 Copa Libertadores Top Scorer: 2004
 Copa Libertadores Team of the Year: 2004
 Samba Gold: 2009 Gold, 2008 Bronze
 La Liga Team of the Season: 2007–08
 FIFA Confederations Cup Golden Shoe: 2009
 FIFA Confederations Cup Silver Ball: 2009
 FIFA Confederations Cup Best XI: 2009
 Copa do Brasil Top Scorer: 2012
 China League One Most Valuable Player: 2016
 China League One Top Scorer: 2016
 IFFHS Brazilian Top Scorer of The 21st Century

References

External links

 
 
 

Living people
1980 births
Sportspeople from Campinas
Association football forwards
Brazilian footballers
Brazilian expatriate footballers
Brazil international footballers
Naturalised citizens of Spain
2003 FIFA Confederations Cup players
2004 Copa América players
2009 FIFA Confederations Cup players
2010 FIFA World Cup players
Copa América-winning players
FIFA Confederations Cup-winning players
Associação Atlética Ponte Preta players
Stade Rennais F.C. players
São Paulo FC players
FC Porto players
Sevilla FC players
UEFA Cup winning players
Tianjin Tianhai F.C. players
CR Vasco da Gama players
Campeonato Brasileiro Série A players
Ligue 1 players
Primeira Liga players
La Liga players
China League One players
Expatriate footballers in France
Expatriate footballers in Portugal
Expatriate footballers in Spain
Expatriate footballers in China
Brazilian expatriate sportspeople in China